5 Against the House is a 1955 American heist film directed by Phil Karlson and starring Guy Madison, Kim Novak and Brian Keith. The supporting cast includes William Conrad. The screenplay is based on Jack Finney's 1954 novel of the same name, later serialized by Good Housekeeping magazine. The film centers on a fictional robbery of what was a real Nevada casino, Harold's Club.

Plot
Four friends enrolled at Midwestern University (which was fictional at the time of the film but became a reality in the mid-1990s) - Brick (Keith), Al (Madison), Ronnie (Kerwin Mathews) and Roy (Alvy Moore) - visit the Harold's Club casino in Reno, Nevada during a weekend trip.

After an hour spent gambling and socializing, the group prepares to leave. Ronnie, however, has lost money playing roulette and must cash a check at the cashier's window. He is accompanied there by Roy, but unbeknownst to either of them, the cashier is being threatened by a man with a gun. Using a concealed security alarm, the cashier alerts casino officials, who apprehend not only the would-be robber, but Roy and Ronnie as well. Al persuades the police to release Roy and Ronnie, but the inquisitive Ronnie has become obsessed with the idea of a spectacular casino robbery, and he begins forming his own plans to rob Harold's Club after he overhears one of the police officers say "There's no way it [robbing Harold's Club] can be done."

Back at college, the incident is seemingly forgotten, though Ronnie begins developing his plans in earnest. Al also re-establishes his relationship with his girlfriend, Kay (Kim Novak), who recently has become a singer at a local nightclub. Al takes Brick, Roy and Ronnie to see one of her shows. After the performance, Brick, a veteran of the Korean war, is provoked into fighting a fellow student over a former girlfriend, and afterward, he suffers from the effects of a dissociative psychotic episode due to an ongoing battle with post-traumatic stress disorder. Later that night, Al encourages a distraught Brick to return to a veteran's hospital for treatment, but he refuses.

Later, Ronnie finalizes his plan to rob Harold's Club. Claiming that the robbery would be an adventurous "first" in their otherwise ordinary lives, Ronnie reveals the plan to Brick and Roy, maintaining that all the money would be returned, thereby ensuring that no one involved would be guilty of a prosecutable crime. Though initially skeptical, Brick and Roy gradually abandon their misgivings. The wealthy Ronnie then uses his personal inheritance to purchase an untraceable trailer and car and fabricate a wooden cart that is identical to the cash carts used at Harold's — the most important component of the heist.

Ronnie determines that the robbery only can proceed if Al participates, maintaining that at least four people will be needed for the dangerously complex operation. But Brick, Roy and Ronnie agree that Al will not go along with the robbery if he is made aware of it. Coincidentally, the day before the robbery, Al proposes to Kay, and they decide to go to Reno with the others to get married right away.

On the 11-hour drive to Reno, Al recognizes the cart's design while riding in the trailer and inadvertently turns on a small reel-to-reel recorder hidden inside the cart and listens to a threatening recording. Ronnie reveals his robbery plans to Kay and Al. Shocked, they refuse to participate.

Brick then pulls out a revolver and seizes control. Fearing a life of destitution and confinement, the increasingly volatile and disturbed Brick explains that the robbery will go ahead as intended, but with one difference: The money will not be returned. Brick threatens to kill Al if anyone attempts to sabotage the plan.

Once they arrive at the casino, the robbery is carried out efficiently as Reno's casino district is filled with costumed partiers celebrating a cowboy-themed fête. In the chaotic festivities, the disguised Brick, Ronnie and Al blend into the crowd and convince a cart operator (William Conrad) to retrieve cash from the money room, using the pre-recorded message to make him believe that there is a desperate man with a gun in the cart who will shoot him if he does not cooperate.

After the robbery, Brick leaves the others behind and escapes with the money, but Al pursues him into a casino parking structure. Kay, having alerted police, follows them, and a tense standoff ensues. Ultimately, Al convinces Brick to give up peacefully. No one else is arrested, and Al and Kay embrace on a crowded street.

Cast
 Guy Madison as Al Mercer
 Kim Novak as Kay Greylek (singing voice was dubbed by Jo Ann Greer)
 Brian Keith as Brick
 Kerwin Mathews as Ronnie
 Alvy Moore as Roy
 William Conrad as Eric Berg
 Jack Dimond as Francis Spiegelbauer
 Jean Willes as Virginia

Production
The film was based on a novel by Jack Finney, which was published in 1954. Stirling Silliphant optioned the book himself, using money he obtained for selling the rights to his novel Maracaibo. Originally the film was to be made at United Artists with Frank Tashlin to direct with Mary Costa to star. Negotiations with UA collapsed and on September 20 Tashlin and Costa dropped out. By October negotiations were underway at Columbia with Peter Godfrey to direct with Milly Vitale to star alongside Guy Madison, Alvy Moore, Roddy McDowall and Robert Horton. Eventually Vitale, McDowall, and Horton dropped out. Parts were taken by contract Columbia players like Kim Novak and Kerwin Mathews.

Though not her film debut, this was one of Novak's early screen appearances. She was among the final group of actors to be signed to a studio contract and recruited through the previous studio system by Columbia Pictures producer Harry Cohn.

Harry Cohn of Columbia insisted that they use Kim Novak. "Who cared?" said Silliphant later. "She couldn't act but the role didn't require a Shakespearean capability. All she had to do was slink and roll those eyes."

Reception

The film was praised upon its release by A.H. Weiler, the film critic at The New York Times, who cited "brisk direction, crisp, idiomatic and truly comic dialogue" as being chief among its positive qualities, but held reservations about the film's development of characters and back-story. Contemporary reviewer Richard Harland Smith has reported that Kim Novak received "favorable, albeit condescending reviews" for her portrayal of "night-club chanteuse" Kaye Greylek, which improved her status at Columbia Pictures.

Influence
Released in 1955, 5 Against the House is an early example of a heist film, and an early film depiction of casino-robbery, later typified by Ocean's 11 (1960) starring the Rat Pack and its remake, Ocean's Eleven (2001) with George Clooney and Brad Pitt, and the remake's sequels. Martin Scorsese has indicated that his 1995 film Casino was influenced by Karlson's production.

Home media
On November 3, 2009, Sony Pictures released the film on standard-definition DVD as a part of its collection titled Film Noir Classics, Volume I with other early noir films : The Sniper (1952), The Big Heat (1953), The Lineup (1958), and Murder by Contract (1958). The DVD includes film introductions and commentaries by directors Martin Scorsese, Michael Mann, and Christopher Nolan as well as authors Eddie Muller and James Ellroy.

On July 16, 2019, Kit Parker Films released the film in the US on Blu-ray disc as part of its three-disc, nine-film set Noir Archive Volume 2: 1954–1956. No bonus material was included. On November 30, 2020, the UK's Powerhouse Films, through its Indicator label, released the film as part of its six-film Blu-ray disc set Columbia Noir #1. Each film in this set was given its own disc, and the 5 Against the House disc includes commentary by film critic David Jenkins, a Three Stooges comedy short titled Sweet and Hot, and a 67-minute video interview with actress Kim Novak recorded at the National Film Theater in London in 1997.

See also
List of American films of 1955

References

External links
 
 
 
 
 

1955 films
1950s crime thriller films
American black-and-white films
American crime thriller films
American heist films
Columbia Pictures films
1950s English-language films
Film noir
Films scored by George Duning
Films directed by Phil Karlson
Films set in Reno, Nevada
American films about gambling
Films with screenplays by Frank Tashlin
Films with screenplays by Stirling Silliphant
Films based on works by Jack Finney
1950s heist films
1950s American films